Zachary Gingras (born 30 July 2001) is a Canadian Paralympic athlete.

Career
He started para athletics aged 15 in Toronto. Gingras has played for the Canadian Para Soccer Team. 
At the Parapan American Games in Lima, his major Games debut, he raced to a silver medal in the T38 400m final with a time of 53.16 seconds, a personal best. His debut Paralympic appearance representing Canada at the 2020 Summer Paralympics.

He secured his first-ever Paralympic medal men's T38 400m event with a lifetime-best of 50.85 seconds, during the 2020 Summer Paralympics.
	
Mayor Frank Scarpitti the Mayor of Markham proclaimed 31 August 2021 as 'Zachary Gingras Day'.

Personal history
Gingras lives with cerebral palsy.
He is a computer science student at the University of Victoria.

References

External links

 
 
 

2001 births
Living people
Canadian male sprinters
Paralympic bronze medalists for Canada
Athletes (track and field) at the 2020 Summer Paralympics
Paralympic track and field athletes of Canada
Paralympic medalists in athletics (track and field)
Medalists at the 2020 Summer Paralympics
Sportspeople from Markham, Ontario